Donald Herriman (born January 2, 1946) is a Canadian retired professional ice hockey forward.  He played 155 games in the World Hockey Association with the Philadelphia Blazers, New York Golden Blades, Jersey Knights and Edmonton Oilers.

External links
 

1946 births
Living people
Canadian ice hockey forwards
Clinton Comets players
Edmonton Oilers (WHA) players
Sportspeople from Sault Ste. Marie, Ontario
Jersey Knights players
New York Golden Blades players
Philadelphia Blazers players
Winston-Salem Polar Twins (SHL) players
Ice hockey people from Ontario
Canadian expatriate ice hockey players in the United States